The Los Angeles City Council is the legislative body of the City of Los Angeles in California.

The council is composed of 15 members elected from single-member districts for four-year terms. The president of the council and the president pro tempore are chosen by the council at the first regular meeting of the term (after June 30 in odd-numbered years until 2017 and the second Monday of December in even-numbered years beginning in 2020). An assistant president pro tempore is appointed by the President. As of 2020, council members receive an annual salary of $207,000 per year, which is among the highest city council salary in the nation.

Regular council meetings are held in the City Hall on Tuesdays, Wednesdays and Fridays at 10 am except on holidays or if decided by special resolution.

In addition, all Los Angeles City Council members have seats on the Regional Council of the Southern California Association of Governments.

Current members

Officers:
President of the Council: Paul Krekorian (since October 18, 2022)
President pro tempore: Curren Price (since October 25, 2022)
Assistant President pro tempore:  Vacant (since December 14, 2020)

Past councils

1850–1889 (Common Council)

Los Angeles was governed by a seven-member Common Council under general state law from 1850 to 1889, when a city charter was put into effect.

1889–1909 (nine wards)

Under the first charter of the city, granted by the Legislature in 1889, the city was divided into nine wards, with a councilman elected from each one by plurality vote. The first election under that system was held on February 21, 1889, and the last on December 4, 1906.

Two-year terms for the City Council began and ended in December, except for the first term, which started in February 1889 and ended in December 1890. The term of office was lengthened to three years effective with the municipal election of December 4, 1906, which was the last year this ward system was in use.

1909–1925 (at large)
Between 1909 and 1925, the council was composed of nine members elected at large in a first-past-the-post voting system.

1925 and after (15 districts)
Regular terms begin on July 1 of odd-numbered years until 2017 and on the second Monday in December of even-numbered years starting with 2020.

Notes

See also

Los Angeles Common Council
List of Los Angeles municipal election returns

References

Chronological Record of Los Angeles City Officials: 1850—1938, Compiled under Direction of Municipal Reference Library City Hall, Los Angeles March 1938 (Reprinted 1966)

External links

Map of Los Angeles City Council districts

 01
City Council
California city councils